, or )  is the art of vocal improvisation over a given melody in Welsh musical tradition. The singer or (small) choir sings a counter melody over a harp melody.

History

 is a unique tradition of singing lyrics over a harp melody. Traditional singers who sang in stately homes tended to sing in a Welsh language that had strict rules about metre, rhyme, and acceleration.  is usually performed by a solo singer and a harpist; however, it is also performed by choirs and with several harps. A common form is have a harp melody written down or a well known tune, while the vocalist improvises their own harmony while singing a poem.

When sung in a competition, there are strict rules about rhythm and cadences. When finishing a piece, the final verse has to end on a perfect cadence that is close to the home key so that the ending of the song is clear. The poets and musicians were part of an all-embracing bardic system. The poets wrote verse of an occasional nature, praising the exploits and virtues of their patrons: the Welsh nobility and high-ranking clergy. They also provided elegies, devotional poetry, commemorated the generous acts of their patrons and satirised certain people in verses which might have the intensity of curses. The art of poetry was learnt orally, i.e. examples were learnt by heart and exercises given as spoken instruction. Part of the poet or musician's craft was the ability to remember the important work of previous generations. One of the spurs to the active and generous patronage of poets must have been the prospect that one's name and deeds would live forever.

Between the beginning of the 14th century and the end of the 16th century Welsh poetical forms were brought to an extreme pitch of elaboration.

Popularity
 is still an important part of Welsh culture and is continued to the present day. It is a major element of the National Eisteddfod and an annual festival celebrating  is held each year.

Notes

Medieval music genres
16th-century music genres
Welsh-language music
Welsh styles of music